Earmilk (sometimes stylized in all caps) is a North American online music publication. Launched in the late 2000s by Montrey Whittaker, Blake Edwards and Eric DeFazio, Earmilk publishes on a variety of music genres, often covering hip hop, electronica and pop music.

History 
EARMILK began as a small mp3 blog in April 2009. In the following decade, EARMILK grew to its multinational status of today, with writers stationed across Canada and the United States.

Content 
In 2013, Refinery29 included EARMILK on its list of "The Best Music Blogs That Aren't Pitchfork." In 2017, the online electronica publication EDM Sauce featured EARMILK in its list of the seven best dubstep blogs on the internet. EARMILK has a noted focus on underground music and their mission statement further specifies their interest in "underground discoveries across all musical genres." In 2015, San Francisco music journalist David Sikorski  took over as Senior Editor of the site. Sikorski has since moved the site from its earlier blog era and into a global media publication with a writing staff of 75 contributors from 6 different countries at any given time throughout the year.

Similar to other online music publications, many EARMILK articles are focused on musical premieres of indie and major label artists. In 2010, for instance, EARMILK premiered Baths' single "Maximalist," which was later featured on Pitchfork and other online music publications. In addition to its music journalism content, EARMILK publishes articles on events, apparel, and art.

References

External links 
Official Website

Online music magazines published in the United States
Music review websites
Internet properties established in 2009